The J. L. Streit House, at 2201 Grand Ave. in Pueblo, Colorado, is a Queen Anne-style house which was built in 1888.  It was listed on the National Register of Historic Places in 1984.

Its front is dominated by a polygonal tower which gave rise to it being known locally as the "octagon house".

It was designed by local architect Patrick P. Mills (d.1933).

It was deemed significant " due to its historic role in the development of Pueblo as one of the premier model homes for the Dundee Investment Company, and for its unique octagonal frontal tower which gained, for it, local landmark status as the brainchild of pioneer architect, P. P. Mills."

It has also been known as the Creel House.

References

External links

		
National Register of Historic Places in Pueblo County, Colorado
Houses completed in 1888
Queen Anne architecture in Colorado